Roberto Eladio Fernández Roa, also known as Gato Fernández, (born 9 July 1954) is a retired football goalkeeper from Paraguay. He was capped 78 times for the Paraguay national football team in an international career that lasted from 1976 to 1989. He was also a member of the Paraguayan team that won the 1979 Copa América. He earned the nickname "El Gato" (The Cat) for his outstanding stretching saves.

Club career
Fernández began his career, debuting professionally, at the age of 17 for Club River Plate of Paraguay. Some of his clubs include Cerro Porteño, Deportivo Cali, RCD Espanyol, Internacional and Palmeiras. He made his international debut for the Paraguay national football team on 10 March 1976 in a Copa del Atlántico match against Uruguay (2–2).

Fernández played his final professional game in 1997 (Cerro Porteño vs. Sportivo Luqueño) at the age of 43, making him the oldest goalkeeper to play professionally in Paraguayan football history.

International career
During the late 1970s to the mid to late 1980s, his only challenger in goal for the Paraguay national team was Ever Hugo Almeida. Finally, in the late 1980s, Fernández became the back-up to Jose Luis Chilavert.

During the 1986 World Cup in Mexico, Fernández started for Paraguay in all four games. He stopped a penalty kick from Mexican Hugo Sánchez to hold the host team to a 1–1 draw.

Retirement
After retiring, Fernández dedicated himself to working as a board of director at his original club (River Plate of Paraguay), and representing other footballers. His son, Gatito Fernández, is a professional goalkeeper, currently in the registry of Botafogo in Brazil.

Honours

Club
Cerro Porteño
Primera División: 1990, 1996
Torneo República: 1991

Internacional
Campeonato Gaúcho: 1991, 1992
Copa do Brasil: 1992

Palmeiras
Campeonato Brasileiro Série A: 1994
Campeonato Paulista: 1994

International
Paraguay
Copa América: 1979

References

External links
International statistics at rsssf

1956 births
Living people
Sportspeople from Asunción
Paraguayan footballers
Paraguayan expatriate footballers
Paraguay international footballers
Association football goalkeepers
Cerro Porteño players
Deportivo Cali footballers
Sport Club Internacional players
Sociedade Esportiva Palmeiras players
River Plate (Asunción) footballers
RCD Espanyol footballers
Paraguayan Primera División players
La Liga players
Categoría Primera A players
Expatriate footballers in Brazil
Expatriate footballers in Colombia
Expatriate footballers in Spain
Paraguayan expatriate sportspeople in Brazil
Paraguayan expatriate sportspeople in Colombia
Paraguayan expatriate sportspeople in Spain
Copa América-winning players
1979 Copa América players
1987 Copa América players
1989 Copa América players
1986 FIFA World Cup players